Kira Christianne Danganan-Azucena is the Assistant Secretary for United Nations and Other International Organizations at the Department of Foreign Affairs of the Republic of the Philippines. 

She had served as Chargé d'affaires, a.i. and Deputy Permanent Representative of the Philippines to the United Nations in New York.  On February 18, 2020, she was elected Chair of the Special Committee on the Charter of the UN and on the Strengthening of the Role of the Organization.

Danganan-Azucena graduated with a degree in mass communication in 1994 from Silliman University.

References

Silliman University alumni
Filipino women ambassadors
Year of birth missing (living people)
Living people